Acacia zatrichota is a shrub belonging to the genus Acacia and the subgenus Lycopodiifoliae. It is native to a small area in the Kimberley region of Western Australia.

See also
 List of Acacia species

References

zatrichota
Acacias of Western Australia
Taxa named by Alex George